The Early Years is a two-part retrospective album series of Tom Waits songs, consisting of recordings made before Waits's debut album, Closing Time. Volume one was released in 1991 and volume two was released in 1993 on Bizarre/Straight. The recordings were made between July and December 1971. Some of the songs on the album appear on the early albums Waits recorded for Asylum Records. In 2010, both volumes of The Early Years were released on vinyl by Manifesto Records.

Volume One
All tracks composed by Tom Waits.

Volume Two
All tracks composed by Tom Waits.

"Ice Cream Man", "Virginia Avenue", "Midnight Lullaby", "Little Trip to Heaven", "Hope I Don't Fall in Love with You", "Grapefruit Moon", "Ol' '55" and "Old Shoes" (as Old Shoes (& Picture Postcards)) were re-recorded on Closing Time.
"Shiver Me Timbers", "Please Call Me, Baby" and "Diamonds on My Windshield" re-recorded on The Heart of Saturday Night.
"Blue Skies" was re-recorded and released as a stand-alone single in October 1974
"Nobody" was re-recorded for Nighthawks at the Diner.

Compilation album series
1991 compilation albums
1993 compilation albums
Tom Waits compilation albums
Straight Records compilation albums